Achyutanand Mishra ((d.1999))  was an Indian politician from the state of Madhya Pradesh of India. He had been an M.L.A from Mauganj (Vidhan Sabha constituency) to Madhya Pradesh Legislative Assembly 1957 as an independent candidate and later from Indian National Congress in 1977.

Notes

Madhya Pradesh MLAs 1977–1980
Madhya Pradesh MLAs 1957–1962
People from Rewa, Madhya Pradesh
Indian National Congress politicians
Year of birth missing
1999 deaths
Indian National Congress politicians from Madhya Pradesh